Diamond Springs (formerly, Diamond Spring and Diamond) is a census-designated place (CDP) in El Dorado County, California, United States. It is part of the Sacramento–Arden-Arcade–Roseville Metropolitan Statistical Area. The population was 11,037 at the 2010 census, up from 4,888 at the 2000 census. The town is registered as California Historical Landmark number 487. It lies at an elevation of 1791 feet (546 m).

History
This town, settled in 1848, derived its name from its crystal clear springs. Among the most gold-rich locations in the region, the area produced a 25-pound nugget, one of the largest ever found in El Dorado County. Its most thriving period was in 1851 and, through its lumber, lime production, and agriculture, Diamond Springs has retained some of its early importance.

A post office was established at Diamond Spring in 1853; the name was changed to Diamond Springs in 1950.

Geography

Demographics

The 2010 United States Census reported that Diamond Springs had a population of 11,037. The racial makeup of Diamond Springs was 9,743 (88.3%) White, 39 (0.4%) African American, 176 (1.6%) Native American, 110 (1.0%) Asian, 6 (0.1%) Pacific Islander, 518 (4.7%) from other races, and 445 (4.0%) from two or more races. Hispanic or Latino of any race were 1,377 persons (12.5%).

The Census reported that 10,904 people (98.8% of the population) lived in households, 23 (0.2%) lived in non-institutionalized group quarters, and 110 (1.0%) were institutionalized.

There were 4,579 households, out of which 1,195 (26.1%) had children under the age of 18 living in them, 2,208 (48.2%) were opposite-sex married couples living together, 530 (11.6%) had a female householder with no husband present, 199 (4.3%) had a male householder with no wife present.  There were 230 (5.0%) unmarried opposite-sex partnerships, and 29 (0.6%) same-sex married couples or partnerships. 1,380 households (30.1%) were made up of individuals, and 848 (18.5%) had someone living alone who was 65 years of age or older. The average household size was 2.38.  There were 2,937 families (64.1% of all households); the average family size was 2.94.

The population was spread out, with 2,253 people (20.4%) under the age of 18, 776 people (7.0%) aged 18 to 24, 2,200 people (19.9%) aged 25 to 44, 3,373 people (30.6%) aged 45 to 64, and 2,435 people (22.1%) who were 65 years of age or older.  The median age was 47.1 years. For every 100 females, there were 88.9 males.  For every 100 females age 18 and over, there were 84.3 males.

The homeowner vacancy rate was 3.4%; the rental vacancy rate was 5.0%.  7,849 people (71.1% of the population) lived in owner-occupied housing units and 3,055 people (27.7%) lived in rental housing units.

Politics

References

External links
El Dorado Western Railway Foundation blog The railway is restoring the Diamond and Caldor Railway No. 4 Shay locomotive at the El Dorado County Historical Museum

Census-designated places in El Dorado County, California
California Historical Landmarks
Populated places established in 1848
Census-designated places in California